The Conference USA Men's Soccer Player of the Year was an annual award given to the best overall player in Conference USA (C-USA) during the NCAA Division I men's soccer season. From C-USA's formation in 1995 until the conference dissolved its men's soccer league after the 2021 season, the Conference awarded the season's best offensive player with Offensive Player of the Year and the best defensive player with the Defensive Player of the Year. Starting in 2009, the additional Player of the Year award was created to recognize the best overall player.

Player of the Year 
 2021: Pedro Dolabella, Marshall
 2020: Vitor Dias, Marshall
 2019: Aimé Mabika, Kentucky
 2018: JJ Williams, Kentucky
 2017: Santiago Patiño, FIU
 2016: Brandt Bronico, Charlotte
 2015: Callum Irving, Kentucky
 2014: Callum Irving, Kentucky
 2013: Kyle Venter, New Mexico
 2012: Daniel Withrow, Marshall and Jaime Ibarra, SMU   
 2011: Mark Sherrod, Memphis
 2010: Arthur Ivo, SMU and Blake Brettschneider, South Carolina   
 2009: Ashley McInnes, Tulsa

Offensive Player of the Year 
 2021: Pedro Dolabella, Marshall
 2020: Vitor Dias, Marshall
 2019: Milo Yosef, Marshall
 2018: JJ Williams, Kentucky
 2017: Aaron Herrera, New Mexico
 2016: Brandt Bronico, Charlotte
 2015: Kyle Parker, Charlotte
 2014: Kyle Parker, Charlotte and Freddy Ruiz, UAB
 2013: Tim Hopkinson, Old Dominion
 2012: Mark Sherrod, Memphis
 2011: Mark Sherrod, Memphis
 2010: Arthur Ivo, SMU and Blake Brettschneider, South Carolina
 2009: Two-Boys Gumede, UAB
 2008: Ashley McInnes, Tulsa
 2007: Bruno Guarda, SMU
 2006: Bruno Guarda, SMU
 2005: Duke Hashimoto, SMU
 2004: Dayton O'Brien, Memphis
 2003: Simon Bird, Louisville
 2002: Jason Cole, Saint Louis
 2001: Dipsy Selolwane, Saint Louis
 2000: Jack Jewsbury, Saint Louis
 1999: Peter Byaruhanga, UAB
 1998: Brian Waltrip, USF
 1997: Jeff Cunningham, USF
 1996: Mike Mekelburg, USF
 1995: Matt McKeon, Saint Louis

Defensive Player of the Year 
 2021: Nathan Dossantos, Marshall
 2020: Patrick Hogan, Charlotte
 2019: Aimé Mabika, Kentucky and Nick O'Callaghan, FIU
 2018: Callum Montgomery, Charlotte
 2017: Santiago Patiño, FIU
 2016: Luke Waechter, Charlotte
 2015: Callum Irving, Kentucky
 2014: Callum Irving, Kentucky
 2013: Kyle Venter, New Mexico 
 2012: Jaime Ibarra, SMU
 2011: Diogo de Almeida, SMU
 2010: Daniel Withrow, Marshall
 2009: Justin Chavez, Tulsa
 2008: Barry Rice, Kentucky
 2007: Barry Rice, Kentucky
 2006: Jay Needham, SMU
 2005: Greg Reece, South Carolina
 2004: Sebastian Vecchio, Memphis
 2003: Adrian Cann, Louisville and Tony McManus, UAB
 2002: Adrian Cann, Louisville and Steve Lawrence, Marquette
 2001: Marty Tappel, Saint Louis
 2000: David Clemente, UAB 
 1999: Andrew Kean, Cincinnati 
 1998: Kevin Kalish, USF
 1997: Max Stoka, Marquette
 1996: Jon Busch, Charlotte
 1995: Loukas Papaconstantinou, UAB

References

External links
 

College soccer trophies and awards in the United States
Conference USA men's soccer
Conference USA
Awards established in 2009
Awards disestablished in 2021